Sapara may refer to:
 Sapara Monastery, Georgia
 Sapara people, an ethnic group of Ecuador and Peru
 Sápara language, a language of Ecuador and Peru
 Sapará language, a language of Brazil

People with the name 
 Adé Sapara, English actor
 Marek Sapara, Slovak sportsman in Turkey
 Oguntola Sapara, Yoruban doctor

See also 
 Sappara